This article shows the rosters of all participating teams at the 2021 Asian Women's Club Volleyball Championship in Nakhon Ratchasima, Thailand.

Pool A

Nakhon Ratchasima

The following is the roster of the Thai club Nakhon Ratchasima VC in the 2021 Asian Club Championship.
Head coach:  Thanakit Inleang

Zhetysu
The following is the roster of the Kazakhstani club Zhetysu VC in the 2021 Asian Club Championship.
Head coach:  Yelena Pavlova

Choco Mucho

The following is the roster of the Philippines national team competing as Choco Mucho in the 2021 Asian Club Championship.
Head coach:  Arthur Mamon

Pool B

Supreme Chonburi

The following is the roster of the Thai club Supreme Volleyball Club in the 2021 Asian Club Championship.
Head coach:  Nataphon Srisamutnak

Altay VC

The following is the roster of the Kazakhstani club Altay VC in the 2021 Asian Club Championship.
Head coach:  Marko Grsic

Rebisco PH

The following is the roster of the Philippines national team competing as Rebisco PH in the 2021 Asian Club Championship.
Head coach:  Jorge Edson

Saipa Tehran

The following is the roster of the Iranian club Saipa Tehran in the 2021 Asian Club Championship.
Head coach:  Maryam Hashemi

References

Asian Women's Club Volleyball Championship